The Serbian national cricket team is the team that represents Serbia in international cricket. It is governed by the Serbian Cricket Federation (also known as Kriket federacija Srbije) which became an affiliate member of the International Cricket Council (ICC) in June 2015 and is an associate member since 2017.

History
Serbia's national team made its first away appearance in 2009. It won one match and lost the other against the Slovenian team Mezica CC. In August 2011, Serbia reached the semi-finals of the EuroT20 tournament in Budapest.

2018-Present
In April 2018, the ICC decided to grant full Twenty20 International (T20I) status to all its members. Therefore, all Twenty20 matches played between Serbia and other ICC members after 1 January 2019 will be a full T20I.

Serbia played their first T20I on 14 October 2019, against Bulgaria, during the 2019 Hellenic Premier League.

Serbia are scheduled to makes their debut in an ICC event, when they take part in the Europe Qualifier tournament in June 2020.

Records and Statistics 

International Match Summary — Serbia
 
Last updated 19 July 2022

Twenty20 International 
 Highest team total: 242/4 v. Bulgaria on 26 June 2022 at National Sports Academy, Sofia.
 Highest individual score: 117, Leslie Dunbar v. Bulgaria on 26 June 2022 at National Sports Academy, Sofia.
 Best individual bowling figures: 3/19, Nicholas Johns-Wickberg v. Romania on 25 June 2021 at National Sports Academy, Sofia.

T20I record versus other nations

Records complete to T20I #1674. Last updated 19 July 2022.

See also
Serbian Cricket Federation
List of Serbia Twenty20 International cricketers

References

Beyond the Test world article on the Serbian team on Cricinfo

External links
 Official Site of Serbian Cricket Federation

Cricket in Serbia
National cricket teams
Serbia in international cricket
C